Oleksandr Volodymyrovych Abramenko (born 4 May 1988) is a Ukrainian Olympic gold medalist freestyle skier, specializing in aerials. He is the 2015–16 Aerials World Cup winner. He competed at the 2006, 2010, 2014 and 2018 Winter Olympics, winning the Olympic gold medal in the men's aerials event at Pyeongchang. Abramenko is also 2019 World Championships and 2022 Winter Olympics silver medalist.

Career
Abramenko competed at the 2005 World Championships in Ruka, Finland, where he was 25th. Abramenko made his World Cup debut on 8 January 2006 in Mont Gabriel, Canada. He placed eighteenth. Even though he was quite young and inexperienced, he competed at the 2006 Winter Olympics in Turin, Italy. In aerials, he did not advance, placing 27th in the qualifying round. On 6 March 2006, he won a silver medal at the 2006 World Junior Championships in Krasnoe Ozero, Russia. On 19 January 2008, Abramenko finished tenth at the World Cup event in Lake Placid, United States. He was among the best in four of seven competitions that season.

Abramenko competed at the 2010 Winter Olympics in Vancouver, Canada, for Ukraine. In aerials, he placed 24th in the event's qualifying round, again failing to advance to the final.

His first World Cup podium came on 25 February 2012, in Minsk, Belarus, when he was second after another Ukrainian Stanislav Kravchuk. That year he also was 3rd in Voss, Norway.

At the 2014 Winter Olympics, he reached the final and placed 6th.

He celebrated his first victory on 1 March 2015 in Minsk, Belarus. In 2015–16 season, he became the first-ever Ukrainian to win World Cup in aerials or any other freestyle discipline. That season was the most successful for him because Abramenko's results were 5th, 3rd, 3rd, 2nd, 13th, and 5th.

In the summer of 2016, Abramenko suffered a severe injury. While practicing on water, he injured his cruciate ligaments and his meniscus and transverse ligament. His knee injury didn't allow him to compete whole next season. He also missed 2017 World Championships.

He returned in the pre-Olympic 2017–18 season. There were concerns that Ukraine, for the first time ever, would not qualify any sportsman for men's freestyle skiing due to crisis in Ukrainian freestyle skiing. Abramenko started that season not confidently, finishing 21st in Beijing. But later, his performances improved, and on 19 January 2018, he achieved his eighth podium in Lake Placid, United States. He was then second after China's Jia Zongyang. These results assured him a spot in 2018 Winter Olympics in Pyeongchang, South Korea. At the 2018 Winter Olympics he surprisingly became the winner. Abramenko became the second native of Ukraine to win Olympic gold in freestyle after Anton Kushnir, who in 2014 represented Belarus.

On 6 February 2019, he won the silver medal at the World Championships in Utah, United States. It was Ukraine's first World Championships medal in men's aerials.

In 2022, Oleksandr Abramenko competed in his fifth Winter Games in Beijing. He won a silver in the Aerials with a score of 116.5.

Personal life
Abramenko's father is Volodymyr Abramenko, a former footballer who played for a few amateur teams in Ukraine and is currently a security officer at MFC Mykolaiv.

Largely unknown to the public until he earned his 2018 Olympic gold medal, Abramenko's place of birth was a source of confusion to his fans as many populated places in Ukraine carry names similar to Pervomaiskyi.

On March 4, 2022, The New York Times reported that Abramenko was planning to leave Kyiv to stay with his coach Enver Ablaev who lives in Mukachevo, Transcarpathian region.

Career results

Winter Olympics

World Championships

World Cup

Individual podiums

Team podiums

Individual rankings

European Cup

Individual podiums

References

External links

More news, pictures, videos and information about Oleksandr Abramenko on espreso.tv

1988 births
Living people
Olympic freestyle skiers of Ukraine
Freestyle skiers at the 2006 Winter Olympics
Freestyle skiers at the 2010 Winter Olympics
Freestyle skiers at the 2014 Winter Olympics
Freestyle skiers at the 2018 Winter Olympics
Freestyle skiers at the 2022 Winter Olympics
People from Pervomaiskyi
Ukrainian male freestyle skiers
Olympic gold medalists for Ukraine
Olympic silver medalists for Ukraine
Olympic medalists in freestyle skiing
Medalists at the 2018 Winter Olympics
Medalists at the 2022 Winter Olympics
Sportspeople from Kharkiv Oblast